In the Garden of Beasts: Love, Terror, and an American Family in Hitler's Berlin is a 2011 non-fiction book by Erik Larson.

Summary

Larson recounts the career of the American Ambassador to Germany, William Dodd, particularly the years 1933 to 1937 when he and his family, including his daughter Martha, lived in Berlin. The Ambassador, who earned his Ph.D. in Leipzig 40 years earlier, and who, at the time of his appointment, was head of the History Department at the University of Chicago, initially hoped that Germany's new Nazi government would grow more moderate, including in its persecution of the Jews. Martha, separated from her husband and in the process of divorce, became caught up in the glamor and excitement of Berlin's social scene and had a series of liaisons, most of them sexual, including among them Gestapo head Rudolf Diels and Soviet attaché and secret agent Boris Vinogradov. She defended the regime to her skeptical friends. Within months of their arrival, the family became aware of the evils of Nazi rule. Dodd periodically protested against it. President Roosevelt was pleased with Dodd's performance while most State Department officials, suspicious of his lack of background in their area of expertise, as well as his inability to finance embassy activities from his own wealth, found him undiplomatic and idiosyncratic.

The title of the work is a loose translation of Tiergarten, a zoo and park in the center of Berlin.

The other historical figures who appear in Larson's account include:
American officials

 Franklin D. Roosevelt, U.S. President
 George Gordon, Counselor, U.S. Embassy in Berlin
 George S. Messersmith, U.S. Consul in Berlin
 William Phillips, U.S. Under Secretary of State

German officials

 Rudolf Diels
 Hermann Göring
 Reinhard Heydrich
 Adolf Hitler
 Edgar Julius Jung, Papen's speechwriter
 Ernst Röhm
 Franz von Papen, Vice Chancellor under Hindenburg.
 Kurt von Schleicher, former Chancellor

Journalists

 Sigrid Schultz, American reporter and Central Europe bureau chief for the Chicago Tribune
 Bella Fromm, German-Jewish diplomatic correspondent for Ullstein Verlag
 H. V. Kaltenborn, American radio announcer
 Edgar Ansel Mowrer, Berlin bureau chief of the Chicago Daily News
 William Shirer, foreign correspondent of the Chicago Daily News

Diplomats
 André François-Poncet, French ambassador to Germany
 Eric Phipps, British ambassador to Germany

Other Americans

 Mildred Fish-Harnack, friend of Martha Dodd and American academic in Berlin
 Stephen Wise, influential American rabbi

Other Germans

 Fritz Haber
 Ernst Hanfstaengl, close friend of Adolf Hitler and Martha Dodd
 Victor Klemperer, diarist

Awards and honors
2012 Chautauqua Prize, shortlist
2011 Christian Science Monitor 15 Best Nonfiction Books

References

External links
NPR:Fresh Air interview with Larson about In the Garden of the Beasts, May 9, 2011
Presentation by Larson on In the Garden of the Beasts, May 23, 2011, C-SPAN
Q&A interview with Larson on In the Garden of the Beasts, July 24, 2011, C-SPAN

2011 non-fiction books
Culture in Berlin
History books about Nazi Germany
Crown Publishing Group books
Books about diplomats